Events in the year 2016 in Kerala

Incumbents 
Governor of Kerala - P. Sathasivam

Chief minister of Kerala - Oommen Chandy (till May),  Pinarayi Vijayan (from May)

Events 

 January 19 - Former Ambassador T. P. Sreenivasan assaulted by Students' Federation of India workers at Global Education Summit venue in Thiruvananthapuram.
 February 17 - Kerala Police launched Cumbersome project. A smart policing and cyber policing initiative.
 March 9 - 
 Radical Islamic groups protests attacks and imposes online boycott on Mathrubhumi following a mention of Prophet in a column named AppTalks.
 Janadhipathya Kerala Congress formed through a split from the Kerala Congress (M).
 April 10 - Puttingal temple fire
 May 16 - 2016 Kerala Legislative Assembly election
 November 10 - Nava Kerala Mission launched.

Deaths 

 January 25 - Kalpana (Malayalam actress), 50
 March 6 - Kalabhavan Mani, 45, actor.
 March 25 - Jishnu Raghavan, 37, actor.

See also 

 History of Kerala
 2016 in India

References 

2010s in Kerala